Goleasca may refer to several villages in Romania:

 Goleasca, a village in Recea, Argeș
 Goleasca, a village in Bucșani, Giurgiu